Daria is a genus of snout moths. It was described by Ragonot in 1888, and contains the species D. coenosella. It is found in central Asia, including Kazakhstan and Mongolia.

References

Moths described in 1888
Phycitinae
Moths of Asia